Sheilas Reward (foaled 1947 in Kentucky) was an American Thoroughbred Champion racehorse who was voted the American Champion Sprint Horse of 1950 and 1951. He was sired by multiple stakes winner Reaping Reward and out of the mare Smart Sheila, a daughter of 1930 American Champion Two-Year-Old Colt Jamestown.

Three-year-old season
Sheilas Reward was bred and raced by Mrs. Louis Lazare, who owned his dam, Smart Sheila.  Louis Lazare was president and major shareholder of Duplex Fabrics Corporation, a distributor of finished rayon fabrics to the dress trade.  Lazare, a past President of the Textile Converters Association of America, Inc.,  sold his company to Burlington Mills Corporation of New York in 1947 and was appointed a vice-president and Director. Sheilas Reward was trained by Eugene Jacobs who guided the three-year-old to wins in the 1950 Select and Interborough Handicaps plus the July 5, 1950 Fleetwing Handicap at Jamaica Race Course in which Sheilas Reward broke the track record by a sizeable 3/5 of a second with a time of 109 2/5 for six furlongs. His performances earned him his first American Champion Sprint Horse honors.

Four-year-old season
Wins at age four in the 1951 Bay Shore, Queens County, and Long Branch Handicaps brought Sheilas Reward his  second straight American Champion Sprint Horse title.

Pedigree

References

1947 racehorse births
Thoroughbred family 12-b
Racehorses bred in Kentucky
Racehorses trained in the United States
Horse racing track record setters
American Champion racehorses